Lee Tsuntung (11 April 1916 – 24 February 2017) was a Chinese basketball player. He competed in the men's tournament at the 1948 Summer Olympics.

See also
 List of centenarians (sportspeople)

References

External links
 

1916 births
2017 deaths
Chinese centenarians
Chinese men's basketball players
Olympic basketball players of China
Basketball players at the 1948 Summer Olympics
Basketball players from Tianjin
Men centenarians
Republic of China men's national basketball team players